
Gniezno County is a unit of territorial administration and local government (powiat) in Greater Poland Voivodeship, west-central Poland. It came into being on January 1, 1999, as a result of the Polish local government reforms passed in 1998.

As of 2006 its total population is 140,333, out of which the population of Gniezno is 70,080, that of Witkowo is 7,855, that of Trzemeszno is 7,789, that of Kłecko is 2,677, that of Czerniejewo is 2,556, and the rural population is 49,376.

Neighbouring counties
Gniezno County is bordered by Żnin County to the north, Mogilno County to the east, Słupca County to the south-east, Września County to the south, Poznań County to the west, and Wągrowiec County to the north-west.

Administrative division
The county is subdivided into 10 gminas (one urban, four urban-rural and five rural). These are listed in the following table, in descending order of population.

References
Polish official population figures 2006

 
Gniezno